Kozłowski (feminine: Kozłowska, plural: Kozłowscy) is the 12th most common surname in Poland (76,657 people in 2009). It is ranked second in both Warmia-Masuria (7,764) and Podlaskie (5,560) It is related to the following surnames:

People 
 Agnieszka Kozłowska-Rajewicz (born 1969), Polish politician
 Artur Kozłowski (born 1985), Polish athlete
 Artur Kozłowski (1977–2011), Polish speleologist
 Bogusława Kozłowska-Tomasiak (born 1952), Polish rower
 Brian Kozlowski (born 1970), American football player
 David Kozlowski, American tennis player and television personality
 Dennis Kozlowski (born 1946), American businessman and convicted criminal
 Edward Kozłowski (1860–1915), Polish-American Catholic priest
 Filip Kozłowski, Polish footballer
 Glenda Kozlowski (born 1974), Brazilian journalist
 Grzegorz Kozłowski (born 1974), Polish diplomat
 Iwona Kozłowska, Polish diplomat
 Joanna Kozłowska (born 1959), Polish opera singer
 Jolanta Róża Kozłowska (born 1957), Polish diplomat
 Kacper Kozłowski (footballer), Polish footballer
 Kacper Kozłowski (sprinter) (born 1986), Polish sprinter
 Leon Kozłowski (1892–1944), Polish archaeologist and Prime Minister
 Linda Kozlowski (born 1958), American actress
 Magdalena Fularczyk-Kozłowska (born 1986), Polish rower
 Maria Franciszka Kozłowska (1862–1921), Polish Christian mystic
 Marian Kozłowski (1927–2004), Polish basketball administrator
 Marian Kozłowski (1915–1943), Polish sprint canoeist
 Maciej Kozłowski (1957–2010), Polish actor
 Roman Kozłowski (1889–1977), Polish paleontologist
 Steve Kozlowski (born 1952), American psychologist
 Tomasz Kozłowski (born 1958), Polish diplomat

See also
 
 
 Kozlovsky
 Koslowski

References

Polish-language surnames